Komarru is a small village in Mudinepalli mandal in the state of Andhra Pradesh in India. The main profession is agriculture and aquaculture.

References 

Villages in Krishna district